Kolling, Kölling or Kølling is a surname:
Carl Kolling
Fabio Kolling, Brazilian footballer
Janne Kolling, Danish handball player
Johannes Kolling, Dutch fencer
Michael Kölling, Kent University lecturer

See also
Bolling (disambiguation)
Kolling Institute of Medical Research